Hartsville is the largest city in Darlington County, South Carolina, United States. It was chartered on December 11, 1891. The population was 7,764 at the 2010 census. Hartsville was chosen as an All-America City in 1996 and again in 2016.  Hartsville has also been a National Arbor Day Foundation Tree City since 1986.

Hartsville is home of Coker University and a branch of Florence–Darlington Technical College. It is also the home of the South Carolina Governor's School for Science and Mathematics, a public boarding high school.

The city is served by the Hartsville Regional Airport.

Hartsville is home to several major corporations including Sonoco Products Company, Duke Energy's H. B. Robinson Nuclear Generating Station, Novolex, and Stingray Boats.

History
The area surrounding Hartsville was once home to several Native American tribes, including the Pee Dee, Catawba, Chicora, Edisto, Sane, and Chicora-Waccamaw, who inhabited the region until European settlers arrived.

Hartsville's first settlement began around 1760. The town is named for Captain Thomas E. Hart, who eventually owned most of the land in the community. Hart started a successful mercantile business, but lost his business and his land during the economic depression of 1837–1838.

In 1845, Thomas Hart's son, John Lide Hart, purchased  of land in what is now downtown Hartsville from Colonel Law. John Hart went on to establish a carriage factory, steam-powered saw mill, grist mill, general store, and Hartsville Baptist Church. Caleb Coker purchased the carriage factory for his son James Lide Coker in 1855.

James Lide Coker came to Hartsville in 1857 with plans to implement new farming methods he had learned at Harvard College. This was interrupted by the start of the Civil War, in which he became a major for the Confederacy. He returned to Hartsville injured and found that his plantation was in shambles. He planned to reconstruct his plantation and bring prosperity to the town of Hartsville.  Major Coker established Welsh Neck High School, which later became Coker College. He also established a seed company, oil mill, fertilizer plant, the Coker and Company General Store, a bank, and the Southern Novelty Company, now known as Sonoco Products Company. Even with his own successes in business, Coker and his family were unable to convince other business owners in the area to build a railroad spur, so they decided to build their own, which became the Hartsville Railroad, completed in 1889.

The Town of Hartsville received its first charter on December 11, 1891, during a period of bustling economic activity and growth.

The railroad eventually became part of the South Carolina Central Railroad, and the Southern Novelty Company and Carolina Fiber Company merged to form Sonoco Products Company. Sonoco eventually expanded to a global scale and became a Fortune 500 company.

Historic sites
Locations listed on the National Register of Historic Places:

 The Arcade Hotel 
 E.W. Cannon House & Store
 Coker University
 Coker Experimental Farms
 J.L. Coker Company Building
 James L. Coker III House
 Robert R. Coker House
 S. Pressly Coker House

 Davidson Hall
 C.K. Dunlap House
 East Home Avenue Historic District
 J.B. Gilbert House
 Thomas E. Hart House
 Hartsville Armory
 Hartsville Passenger Station
 Hartsville Post Office

 Wade Hampton Hicks House
 Jacob Kelley House
 Lawton Park and Pavilion
 Magnolia Cemetery
 A.M. McNair House
 Memorial Hall
 Paul H. Rogers House 
 West College Avenue Historic District

Points of interest 
 Center Theater
 Coker University
 Hartsville Museum
 Kalmia Gardens
 Sonoco Products

Geography
Hartsville is located in northwestern Darlington County at  (34.369474, −80.080783). South Carolina Highway 151 bypasses the city to the southwest; it leads southeast  to Darlington, the county seat, and northwest  to McBee.

Prestwood Lake, an impoundment on Black Creek, is on the northern border of the city. Black Creek is part of the Pee Dee River watershed.

Climate
Hartsville enjoys a mild climate year-round. It experiences 213 sunny days on average. During the winter months, Hartsville can receive snowfall.

Demographics

2020 census

As of the 2020 United States Census, there were 7,446 people, 2,934 households, and 1,860 families residing in the city. The population density was 1257.77 people per square mile. The racial makeup of the city was 50.58% White, 42.29% African American, 0.12% Native American, 1.22% Asian, 2.55% Hispanic or Latino, and 3.24% two or more races.

There were 2,934 households, of which 26.5% had children under the age of 18 living with them, 33.8% were married couples living together, 44.7% had a female householder with no spouse present, 16.2% had a male householder with no spouse present, and 5.3% were non-families.  The average household size was 2.41 and the average family size was 3.07.

In the city, the population was spread out, with 26.5% under the age of 18, 13.5% from 18 to 24, 12.2% from 25 to 34, 9.2% from 35 to 44, 12.8% from 45 to 54, 11.7% from 55 to 64, and 14.0% who were 65 years of age or older. The median age was 32.7 years. The population is made up of 45.7% males and 54.3% females.

The median income for a household in the city was $35,487 with the median income for a family at $45,556, a married-couple family at $87,159, and non-family households at $24,200. The per capita income for the city was $23,469. 28.8% of the population was below the poverty line, including 52.0% of those under age 18 and 19.0% of those age 65 or over.

Economy
Major employers in the area include Sonoco Products Company, Nucor Corporation, Carolina Pines Regional Medical Center, Novolex, Stingray Boats, North Industrial Machine, and Duke Energy's H. B. Robinson Nuclear Generating Station.

At 4.3%, the unemployment rate is slightly higher than the national average of 3.9%. Job growth over the next decade is expected to be approximately 27.4% which is significantly lower than the US average of 33.5%. The household median income is $29,276/year which is significantly lower than the national median income of $53,482/year.

Arts and culture
There are many festivals, parades, and other events that residents of Hartsville look forward to each year.

Annual events
Screen on the Green is a summer event in which the city sets up a  screen on the grounds of Burry Park and shows licensed movies. This is a family event that is free to the public. The Screen on the Green is sometimes held outside of its normal season, such as during the holidays.
The "Hartsville Christmas Parade: a Miracle on Carolina Avenue" is an annual parade held in December of each year where members of numerous local and regional schools, businesses, and other organizations parade down the main street of the city. Santa Claus is usually found at the end of the parade as a symbol of Christmas coming soon.
The Annual Mayor's Christmas Tree Lighting is held at Burry Park. There are musical and dance performances, and the Santa Mailbox, in which local children can submit letters to Santa Claus, is unveiled at this event.

Parks
Hartsville has several parks within the city.

Byerly Park is a  multi-use recreational park. The park has six soccer fields, eight softball/baseball fields, two football fields, six tennis courts, an eight-lane 400-meter track and field facility, twelve horseshoe pits, two playgrounds, a picnic area, concession stands, and the Piratesville Splash Pad. Piratesville is one of the largest splash pads in the state of South Carolina and operates Tuesday through Sunday when Darlington County Schools are out of session for summer vacation.
Burry Park is an open green space in the heart of Hartsville. It is home to the Hartsville Veterans Memorial and Veterans Walk and the Tales on the Town bronze sculpture. Public restrooms are available. Burry Park hosts Hartsville's "Screen on the Green" film series, festivals, and other events.
Centennial Park was developed for the 1981 centennial of Hartsville's incorporation. The park features covered sitting areas as well as a large fountain. During the Christmas season it hosts a large metal-frame lit Christmas tree.
Lawton Park offers tennis courts, picnic shelters, a boardwalk and pier, and playgrounds. It is home to the Lawton Park Pavilion, a historic building constructed in 1938 by the city of Hartsville with funding from the Works Progress Administration. The facility is an example of New Deal-era recreation facilities. It was renovated in 2007 and 2008. It is available for private events and includes elevators and a caterer's kitchen. The playground at Lawton Park was replaced in 2015 to make it safer and more accessible.
Pride Park features a picnic shelter, playground, restrooms and an outdoor stage used for events such as the annual "Gospel in the Park" series. The park is built on the site of the Hartsville Graded School, the first public school for black children in Hartsville, operating from about 1900 to 1921, as well as the later Butler School, named for the Rev. Henry H. Butler, longtime principal of the school. Park signage and a South Carolina Historical Marker placed at the park make note of the Rev. T.J. James, who began a Sunday school at the site in 1922 which grew into Mt. Pisgah Presbyterian Church. James also established the Mt. Pisgah Nursery School in the old graded school structure. James' family donated the land to the city of Hartsville for Pride Park, which was established in 1986.
The Vista is a pedestrian corridor built along Railroad Avenue between Coker Avenue and Second Street, connecting the South Carolina Governor's School for Science and Mathematics and portions of Coker College with downtown Hartsville. The space was redeveloped in 2009–10 by the city of Hartsville from a portion of the former Hartsville railroad yard which once connected Hartsville's downtown with major rail lines. The green space in The Vista features a walking path, a pond, fountains and park benches.
The Hartsville Dog Park is an as-of-yet unbuilt but planned dog park which the city will begin construction on in the near future. Plans for this park were unveiled in early 2016. Land for this park has been acquired by the city at the corners of Coker Avenue and Railroad Avenue, near The Vista. Dogs will be allowed to roam freely without a leash and the park will be divided by fencing into two separate areas: one for large dogs and one for small dogs. The city will require that owners provide proof of current vaccinations for their pets in order to utilize this public space. The park will also be equipped with a washing station, covered benches, and waste bag receptacles.  At present there is a fenced-in area at Byerly park for dogs.  There are two sections (big dogs and small dogs) plus a water station and waste bags.

City government and programs
Hartsville has a council–manager government. The city council, Hartsville's legislative body, is made of a mayor who is elected at large, and six council members who are elected in single-member districts, with one member elected by his/her peers as Mayor Pro-Tem. Regular meetings take place on the second Tuesday of the month.
City Hall is located at 100 E Carolina Avenue in a building previously occupied by the Bank of America. The new city hall opened in mid-2013. It has been praised by the citizens of Hartsville as a significant upgrade for the downtown area.

Main Street Hartsville
The Main Street Hartsville program is a partnership of the City of Hartsville, the Community Foundation for a Better Hartsville, and Main Street South Carolina, a program of the National Main Street Center. The organization seeks to build a vibrant downtown in Hartsville, focusing on thriving businesses, entertainment, recreating and historic preservation. It follows the Main Street "Four Point Approach" of organization, promotion, design, and economic restructuring. Main Street Hartsville administers a Sign and Paint grant for local businesses. It also oversees the Hartsville Farmers Market, Start-Up Hartsville, and Hartsville for the Holidays. They periodically hold contests for local businesses.

Education
The public schools in Hartsville are governed by the Darlington County School District. For the 2019–2020 school year, the district approved a fiscal budget of $95,383,423.13. The district-wide student-to-teacher ratio is about 16:1 and the district spends about $14,178 per student.

Public primary education
 Carolina Elementary
Bay Road Elementary
Butler Academy (Charter school)
 Hartsville Middle School
 North Hartsville Elementary
 Southside Early Childhood Center
 Thornwell School of the Arts
 Washington St. Elementary
 West Hartsville Elementary

Public secondary education
 Hartsville High
 Mayo High School for Math, Science, and Technology, located in Darlington, serves students from the entire county, including Hartsville.
 South Carolina Governor's School for Science and Mathematics

Private schools
 Emmanuel Christian School (grades 2K-12), located just east of downtown Hartsville.
 Students from Hartsville attend other private schools in the area, Robert E. Lee Academy (grades 2K-12), and Trinity-Byrnes Collegiate School (grades 7–12).

Higher education
Coker University, a private, baccalaureate-granting institution, is located in Hartsville. It offers a four-year program that emphasizes a practical application of the liberal arts, as well as hands-on and discussion-based learning within and beyond the classroom.  In its 2016 rankings, U.S. News & World Report ranked Coker as the 20th Best College in the South, and the 15th Best College for Veterans. The Princeton Review, for the 11th consecutive year, named Coker a "Best College in the Southeast" in 2016.

Florence–Darlington Technical College, based in nearby Florence, South Carolina, maintains a satellite campus in Hartsville.

Library
Hartsville has a public library, a branch of the Darlington County Library System.

Media
Hartsville is served by several local, regional, and state media outlets. The Hartsville Messenger, an affiliate of SCNow, is the local newspaper, with The State serving as a source for statewide news. WBTW News 13, WPDE-TV News 15, and WFXB Fox TV are the news channels that serve the Hartsville area as well as the entire Pee Dee and Grand Strand regions.

Infrastructure
Downtown Hartsville and most neighborhoods in Hartsville are designed around a standard grid layout whose use began when the city first developed. However, in newly developed sections of the city, such as around Hartsville Crossing, the road layout is less orthodox.

Utilities
The City of Hartsville maintains garbage and recycling services for residents within the city limits, as well as water services. Electric services are provided by Duke Energy and Pee Dee Electric Cooperative. Dish Network, DirecTV, AT&T, and Spectrum serve television and internet needs.

Healthcare
Carolina Pines Regional Medical Center is a large medical complex located on the edge of Hartsville. The hospital has 116 beds available for patients, not including those located in the hospital's Level III capable trauma/ER unit.

Notable people
 Aziz Ansari, actor and comedian, alumnus of South Carolina Governor's School for Science and Mathematics
 Rich Batchelor, former MLB relief pitcher
 Rufus Bess, former NFL cornerback
 Roderick Blakney, "MooMoo", former professional basketball player
 James Robert Campbell, "Jim", former MLB pinch hitter
 James Lide Coker, founder of the Southern Novelty Company (now Sonoco Products) and of Coker College
 Chad Dawson, current boxer; also, formerly a WBC, IBF, IBO, NABF, Ring magazine, and Lineal light heavyweight champion.
 Leeza Gibbons, television personality
 Cpt. Thomas Edward Hart, founder of Hartsville, SC in 1817
 Albert Haynesworth, former NFL defensive lineman
 Terrance Herrington, former middle-distance ACC track champion and US Olympic Track & Field athlete
 Shannon Johnson, "Pee Wee", former professional basketball player, WNBA All Star, and member of the gold medal-winning USA Basketball team in the 2004 Summer Olympics
 Riley Knoxx, dancer and drag performer
 Jordan Lyles, professional baseball player for MLB's Baltimore Orioles
 Tony McDaniel, former NFL defensive lineman
 Kelvin Moses, former NFL linebacker
 Bobo Newsom, former MLB pitcher and four-time MLB All-Star selection
 Jeryl Prescott, American actress, best known for her role as Jacqui in the AMC series The Walking Dead

References

External links

 City of Hartsville official website

 
Cities in South Carolina
Cities in Darlington County, South Carolina
Florence, South Carolina metropolitan area
Populated places established in 1760